"Bitches N Marijuana" is a song by American recording artists Chris Brown and Tyga. It was released on May 26, 2015 as the second single from their second collaborative effort, a studio album titled Fan of a Fan: The Album (2015). The song features a guest appearance from West Coast rapper Schoolboy Q.

Music video
A music video for the song was released on June 18, 2015.

Charts

Certifications

References

2015 singles
2014 songs
Chris Brown songs
Tyga songs
Schoolboy Q songs
RCA Records singles
Cash Money Records singles
Songs written by Chris Brown
Songs written by Schoolboy Q
Songs about cannabis
Songs written by Nic Nac
Songs written by Tyga
Songs written by PJ (singer)